The Lagos serotine (Eptesicus platyops) is a species of vesper bat. It is found in Equatorial Guinea, Nigeria, and possibly Senegal.

References

Eptesicus
Bats of Africa
Taxa named by Oldfield Thomas
Mammals described in 1901
Taxonomy articles created by Polbot